Balladromma Beg Halt (Manx: Stadd Valley Drommey Beg) is an intermediate stopping place on the Manx Electric Railway on the Isle of Man.

Alias
The halt is sometimes referred to as "Halfway House" in reference to the nearby public house and one-time coaching house, now known as the Liverpool Arms.

Facilities
Today it remains as a request stop marked by a solitary sign denoting the fact, and a post box mounted in a concrete pillar, a remnant of the days when the railway held the contract for mail collection which it held until 1975 when winter closure necessitated its demise.  The station once had a waiting shelter for passengers which took the form of a traditional M.E.R. style corrugated iron hut.  This was installed circa 1900 but has long since been demolished.  Nearby is a modern bus shelter used for the island's Bus Vannin services which doubles up as a shelter for waiting tram passengers at this rural location.

Traffic
The majority of traffic at this spot is gleaned from customers to the nearby public house which was often reached by tramcar until relatively recently when timetable cutbacks and modifications ensured that this was no longer viable for most, bus services being preferred.

Location
To the immediate north of the halt, the railway crosses the main Douglas-Laxey road for the first time, the halt itself sits to the north of an un-gated level crossing carrying the Douglas-Baldrine coast road.  At one time this was a railway-operated toll road.

Route

Also
Manx Electric Railway Stations

References

Sources
 Manx Electric Railway Stopping Places (2002) Manx Electric Railway Society
 Island Images: Manx Electric Railway Pages (2003) Jon Wornham
 Official Tourist Department Page (2009) Isle Of Man Heritage Railways

Railway stations in the Isle of Man
Manx Electric Railway
Railway stations opened in 1896